Flávio César Resende Gualberto (born 22 April 1993) is a Brazilian professional volleyball player. He is a member of the Brazilia national team. The 2019 World Cup and the 2021 Nations League winner. At the professional club level, he plays for Sir Safety Perugia.

Honours

Clubs
 FIVB Club World Championship
  Betim 2022 – with Sir Safety Perugia

 CSV South American Club Championship
  Belo Horizonte 2013 – with Minas Tênis Clube

 National championships
 2022/2023  Italian Super Cup, with Sir Safety Perugia

Youth national team
 2011  U19 Pan American Cup
 2012  U23 Pan American Cup
 2012  CSV U21 South American Championship
 2013  FIVB U21 World Championship
 2014  CSV U23 South American Championship

Individual awards
 2010: CSV U19 South American Championship – Best Blocker
 2014: CSV U23 South American Championship – Best Middle Blocker
 2015: Pan American Cup – Best Blocker
 2015: Pan American Cup – Best Middle Blocker 
 2018: Pan American Cup – Best Middle Blocker
 2019: CSV South American Club Championship – Best Middle Blocker
 2019: CSV South American Championship – Best Middle Blocker
 2022:  FIVB Club World Championship – Best Middle Blocker

References

External links

 
 Player profile at LegaVolley.it 
 Player profile at PlusLiga.pl 
 Player profile at Volleybox.net''

1993 births
Living people
Sportspeople from Minas Gerais
Brazilian men's volleyball players
Pan American Games medalists in volleyball
Volleyball players at the 2015 Pan American Games
Medalists at the 2015 Pan American Games
Pan American Games silver medalists for Brazil
Brazilian expatriate sportspeople in Poland
Expatriate volleyball players in Poland
Brazilian expatriate sportspeople in Italy
Expatriate volleyball players in Italy
Warta Zawiercie players
Middle blockers